is the railway station in Tabira-cho Ogita-men, Hirado City, Nagasaki Prefecture. It is operated by Matsuura Railway and is on the Nishi-Kyūshū Line.

Lines
Matsuura Railway
Nishi-Kyūshū Line

Adjacent stations

Station layout
The station is on a bank with a single side platform.

Environs
Rapeseed flowers which a local farming family planted in the rice field around the station blooms in spring.
National Route 204
Hokusho Agricultural High School
Tabira Insect Park
Tabira Catholic Church

History
March 11, 1989 - Opens for business.

References
Nagasaki statistical yearbook (Nagasaki prefectural office statistics section,Japanese)

External links
Matsuura Railway (Japanese)

Railway stations in Japan opened in 1989
Railway stations in Nagasaki Prefecture